Monj-e Bala or Monj Bala may refer to:
 Monj-e Bala, Fars
 Monj-e Bala, Chaharmahal and Bakhtiari